Arman Parvez Murad is a Bangladeshi television and film actor. He won Bangladesh National Film Award for Best Actor for his role in the film Ghani (2006).

Works
 Bachelor (2004) 
 Ghani (2006)
 Rabeya (2008)
 Amar Bondhu Rashed (2011)
Shongram (2014)
 Niyoti (2016)
 August 1975 (2021)
 Myth of Love: A Known Story (2021)
 Birotto (2022)

References

External links

Living people
Bangladeshi male television actors
Bangladeshi male film actors
Year of birth missing (living people)
Best Actor National Film Award (Bangladesh) winners